Luc Govaerts (born 25 January 1959) is a Belgian former professional racing cyclist. He rode in the 1984 Tour de France and won the 10th stage of the 1984 Herald Sun Tour.

Competitions

1981 

 Belgian Champion Team Race, Amateurs, with Robert Hendrickx

1984 

 10th stage Herald Sun Tour

1985 

 Schaal Sels

1987 

 Final class Circuit Franco–Belge

1990 

 Omloop van het Waasland

Results

References

External links
 

1959 births
Living people
Belgian male cyclists
Cyclists from Antwerp Province
People from Brecht, Belgium